David Pizanti (born 27 May 1962) is an Israeli former professional footballer who began his career as a forward with Hapoel Hadera but was converted to a left back at Maccabi Netanya. He also played for 1. FC Köln, Queens Park Rangers and Hapoel Haifa before his career was ended prematurely by injury.

References

External links
Jews in Sports profile

1962 births
Living people
Israeli Jews
Israeli footballers
Maccabi Netanya F.C. players
1. FC Köln players
Hapoel Tel Aviv F.C. players
Queens Park Rangers F.C. players
Hapoel Tzafririm Holon F.C. players
Hapoel Haifa F.C. players
Hapoel Petah Tikva F.C. players
Hapoel Rishon LeZion F.C. players
Liga Leumit players
Bundesliga players
Israel international footballers
Israeli expatriate footballers
Expatriate footballers in England
Expatriate footballers in West Germany
Israeli expatriate sportspeople in England
Israeli expatriate sportspeople in West Germany
People from Pardes Hanna-Karkur
Association football fullbacks
Association football forwards